Oakwood was a provincial electoral district in Ontario, Canada.  It was created for the 1975 provincial election, and was retained until redistribution in 1999. It was abolished into Davenport, Eglinton—Lawrence, York South—Weston and St. Paul's.  Oakwood was located in York, which was previously part of Metropolitan Toronto and is now part of the City of Toronto.

Oakwood was a fairly safe seat for the New Democratic Party for most of its existence, although the Liberals won in 1987 and 1995.  Both Liberal MPPs, Chaviva Hošek and Mike Colle, served in the Ontario cabinet at one time or another.

The longest-serving member for Oakwood was Tony Grande, who held the seat from 1975 to 1987.  Tony Rizzo, elected in 1990, was forced to sit as an Independent MP for twenty months after it was disclosed that his construction firm had been charged with violating Ontario's labour code in 1989.  He returned to caucus in 1992.

The riding had large Italian and Portuguese communities, and there was a significant increase in Caribbean immigrants during the 1980s.

Members of Provincial Parliament

Electoral results

1975 boundaries

1987 boundaries

References

Notes

Citations

Former provincial electoral districts of Ontario
Provincial electoral districts of Toronto